Botrytis anthophila is a fungal plant pathogen.

References

External links
 USDA ARS Fungal Database

Fungal plant pathogens and diseases
Sclerotiniaceae
Fungi described in 1913